Hanım may refer to:

 Khanum (Turkish Hanım), a female royal and aristocratic title

 Hanım (film), 1988 Turkish film
 Jeshm Afet Hanim (died 1907), the Princess consort of Khedive Isma'il Pasha of Egypt

See also
 Humanoid animation, sometimes called H-anim
 Sadberk Hanım Museum